Khandab (also Romanized as Khandāb and Khondāb; also known as Khundab) is a village in Sojas Rud Rural District, Sojas Rud District, Khodabandeh County, Zanjan Province, Iran. In 2006, its population was 1,562, in 376 families.

References 

Populated places in Khodabandeh County